Oiartzualdea in Basque (Oarsoaldea in Spanish) is a subcomarca of Donostialdea in Gipuzkoa, formed by four municipalities, Errenteria being the main town.

Municipalities

References

External links
Official Website 

Oarsoaldea